The 1990 TranSouth 500 was the fifth stock car race of the 1990 NASCAR Winston Cup Series season and the 34th iteration of the event. The race was held on Sunday, April 1, 1990, before an audience of 55,000 in Darlington, South Carolina, at Darlington Raceway, a  permanent egg-shaped oval racetrack. The race took the scheduled 367 laps to complete. On the final restart with three laps to go in the race, Richard Childress Racing driver Dale Earnhardt would manage to fend off the field to take his 41st career NASCAR Winston Cup Series victory and his second victory of the season. To fill out the top three, Roush Racing driver Mark Martin and Robert Yates Racing driver Davey Allison would finish second and third, respectively.

On lap 212 of the race, a 13-car pileup would occur on the track's front-stretch. One of the 13 drivers involved, Neil Bonnett, would suffer brain injuries that would lead towards amnesia and dizziness that would ultimately lead to the effective end of his racing career, only racing in two more races in 1993 before dying in an practice session accident in 1994.

Background 

Darlington Raceway is a race track built for NASCAR racing located near Darlington, South Carolina. It is nicknamed "The Lady in Black" and "The Track Too Tough to Tame" by many NASCAR fans and drivers and advertised as "A NASCAR Tradition." It is of a unique, somewhat egg-shaped design, an oval with the ends of very different configurations, a condition which supposedly arose from the proximity of one end of the track to a minnow pond the owner refused to relocate. This situation makes it very challenging for the crews to set up their cars' handling in a way that is effective at both ends.

Entry list 

 (R) denotes rookie driver.

Qualifying 
Qualifying was originally scheduled to be split into two rounds. The first round was scheduled to be held on Thursday, March 29, at 3:00 PM EST. However, due to rain, the first round was cancelled, and qualifying was condensed into one round, which was held on Friday, March 30, at 2:00 PM EST. Each driver would have one lap to set a time. For this specific race, positions 1–40 would be decided on time, and depending on who needed it, a select amount of positions were given to cars who had not otherwise qualified but were high enough in owner's points; up to two provisionals were given.

Three drivers would fail to qualify.

Full qualifying results

Race results

Standings after the race 

Drivers' Championship standings

Note: Only the first 10 positions are included for the driver standings.

References 

1990 NASCAR Winston Cup Series
NASCAR races at Darlington Raceway
April 1990 sports events in the United States
1990 in sports in South Carolina